Football Club Khust or Khust is a Ukrainian professional football team from Khust.

History
Founded in 2019, until 2022 the club competed exclusively in regional competitions of Zakarpattia Oblast. The club managed to become the winner of the Zakarpattia Oblast Championship and Zakarpattia Oblast Super Cup in 2021. For the first time in 2022 the club turned professional and made its debut in the 2022–23 Ukrainian Second League.

Players

Current squad

|other=captain

League and cup history
{|class="wikitable"
|-bgcolor="#efefef"
! Season
! Div.
! Pos.
! Pl.
! W
! D
! L
! GS
! GA
! P
!Domestic Cup
!colspan=2|Europe
!Notes
|-
|align=center|2022–23
|align=center|3rd
|align=center|
|align=center|
|align=center|
|align=center|
|align=center|
|align=center|
|align=center|
|align=center|
|align=center|
|align=center|
|align=center|
|align=center|
|}

See also
 FC Rus Khust

References

Ukrainian Second League clubs
Khust
Association football clubs established in 2019
2019 establishments in Ukraine
Sport in Zakarpattia Oblast